The Enterocystidae are a family of parasites in the phylum Apicomplexa.

Taxonomy

There is one genus in this family - Enterocystis

History

This family was created by Codreanu in 1940.

Description
These organisms have a spherical nucleus and can have a deep brown cytoplasm. They are found the gut of insect hosts; such hosts include Psocoptera, and Ephemeroptera

References

Apicomplexa families
Conoidasida